The Boxing Tournament at the 2002 South American Games was held in the Ginásio da Escola de Educação Física in Belém, Brasil from August 5 to August 11, 2002.

Medal winners

Medal table

References
Amateur Boxing
COB
boxergs

S
2002 South American Games events
2002